The LSU Tigers women's gymnastics team  represents Louisiana State University in NCAA Division I women's gymnastics. The team competes in the Southeastern Conference and is currently coached by Jay Clark, who is coaching in his fifth season.  The Pete Maravich Assembly Center serves as the home arena for the team.

History
The gymnastics program was founded in 1970. In 2008, LSU made their first Super Six appearance. The team also made Super Six appearances in 2009, 2013 and 2014. In both the 2016 and 2017 seasons, the program made the Super Six and finished second at the 2016 and 2017 NCAA Women's Gymnastics Championships. Also in 2017, LSU won back-to-back SEC Regular Season and SEC Championship Meet championships. In 2018, LSU again won back-to-back SEC Regular Season and SEC Championship Meet championships and reached the Super Six.

In 2019, LSU won the SEC Championship Meet in New Orleans and made an appearance in the first-ever Four on the Floor in NCAA Women's Gymnastics Championship. The team finished second overall for the third time in school history.

In 2022, LSU placed fifth at the SEC Championships with a score of 196.725 despite entering the competition with the No. 2 seed. No. 6 LSU placed third behind No. 11 Missouri and No. 22 Iowa in the first session of the semi-final of the Raleigh regional; this eliminated them from the postseason, leading to an 18th-place finish nationally.

Championships

Individual NCAA champions

Conference championships
SEC Regular Season champions (5): 1981, 2015, 2016, 2017, 2018
SEC Championship Meet champions (4): 1981, 2017, 2018, 2019

NCAA Championship appearances

Super Six appearances

Four on the Floor appearances

Arena & facilities

Pete Maravich Assembly Center

The Pete Maravich Assembly Center is a 13,215-seat multi-purpose arena in Baton Rouge, Louisiana. The arena opened in 1972 and is home of the LSU Tigers gymnastics team. It was originally known as the LSU Assembly Center, but was renamed in honor of Pete Maravich, a Tiger basketball legend, shortly after his death in 1988. The Maravich Center is known to locals as "The PMAC" or "The Palace that Pete Built," or by its more nationally known nickname, "The Deaf Dome," coined by Dick Vitale.

The slightly oval building is located directly to the north of Tiger Stadium, and its bright-white roof can be seen in many telecasts of that stadium.  The arena concourse is divided into four quadrants: Pete Maravich Pass, The Walk of Champions, Heroes Hall and Midway of Memories. The quadrants highlight former LSU Tiger athletes, individual and team awards and memorabilia pertaining to the history of the LSU Tigers gymnastics team.

LSU Gymnastics Training Facility

The LSU Gymnastics Training Facility is the practice venue for the LSU Tigers gymnastics team. The new facility opened in 2016 and provides 38,000 square feet of training and team space.

LSU Strength and Conditioning facility
 
The LSU Tigers basketball strength training and conditioning facility is located in the LSU Strength and Conditioning facility. Built in 1997, it is located adjacent to Tiger Stadium. Measuring 10,000-square feet with a flat surface, it has 28 multi-purpose power stations, 36 assorted selectorized machines and 10 dumbbell stations along with a plyometric specific area, medicine balls, hurdles, plyometric boxes and assorted speed and agility equipment. It also features 2 treadmills, 4 stationary bikes, 2 elliptical cross trainers, a stepper and stepmill.

Head coaches

Roster

Coaching staff
Head coach: Jay Clark
Assistant coach: Ashleigh Gnat
Assistant coach: Garrett Griffeth
Volunteer coach: Courtney McCool Griffeth  
Director of Operations: Katie Copeland

Past Olympians 
 Shanyn MacEachern  (1996)
 Sarah Finnegan (2012 alternate)
 Ruby Harrold  (2016)

See also
LSU Tigers and Lady Tigers

Footnotes

References

External links
 

 
Sports clubs established in 1975
1975 establishments in Louisiana